This is a list of the first women lawyer(s) and judge(s) in South Carolina. It includes the year in which the women were admitted to practice law (in parentheses). Also included are women who achieved other distinctions such becoming the first in their state to graduate from law school or become a political figure.

Firsts in South Carolina's history

Law School 

 First female law graduate: Claudia J. Sullivan (1918)

Lawyers 

First female: James M. Perry (1918) 
 First African American female: Cassandra E. Maxwell (1938) 
 First female to practice in South Carolina's federal courts: Sue Evelyn Lester

State judges 

 First female (magistrate): Kitty Herbert in 1979 
First female (judge): Judy Bridges in 1983
First female (South Carolina Supreme Court): Jean H. Toal in 1988  
First African American female (family court): Abigail Rogers in 1991
 First female (Chief Justice; South Carolina Supreme Court): Jean H. Toal in 2000

Federal judges 
First female (federal court): Jean Galloway Bissell in 1984 
First female (United States Court of Appeals for the Fourth Circuit): Karen J. Williams (1980) in 1992 
First African American female (U.S. District Court for the District of South Carolina): Margaret B. Seymour (1977) in 1998

Deputy Attorney General 

 First female: Karen L. Henderson

United States Attorney 

First female: Sherri Lydon in 2018

South Carolina Bar Association 

 First female president: Elaine Fowler in 1993

Firsts in local history

 Courtney Clyburn-Pope: First female (and African American) to serve as a resident judge (Second Judicial Circuit) in Aiken County, South Carolina (2019)
 Grace White (1937): First female lawyer in Beaufort, South Carolina [Beaufort County, South Carolina]
 Mabel Lee Parrott Shuler: First female (non-attorney) magistrate in Berkeley County, South Carolina (1984)
 Hannah R. Axelman (1931): First female lawyer in Charleston County, South Carolina
 Margie Elizabeth Fuller Cannon: First female magistrate in Charleston County, South Carolina (1968)
 Barbara Usher Griffin: First female magistrate judge for Chester County, South Carolina
 Nettie B. Cusack: First African American Female Probate Judge in Dorchester County (2005-2011)
 Carolyn Smith Knight: First female magistrate in Florence County, South Carolina
 Jasmine Twitty: First female (and African American female) to become the youngest judge appointed in Easley, South Carolina (Pickens County, South Carolina; 2015)
 Karen Sanchez Roper: First female resident judge in Pickens County, South Carolina (2016)

See also  

 List of first women lawyers and judges in South Dakota
 List of first women lawyers and judges in the United States
 Timeline of women lawyers in the United States
 Women in law

Other topics of interest 

 List of first minority male lawyers and judges in the United States
 List of first minority male lawyers and judges in South Carolina

References 

Lawyers, South Carolina, first
South Carolina, first
Women, South Carolina, first
Women, South Carolina, first
Women in South Carolina
South Carolina lawyers
Lists of people from South Carolina